The Oberliga (English: Upper League) is the third tier of ice hockey in Germany, below DEL2 and ahead of the Regionalliga. Since the 2015/16 season, the league has been split into two regionalised divisions, Nord (north) and Süd (south). The Oberliga was originally founded in 1948 and is administered by the German Ice Hockey Federation (DEB).

History

The Oberliga is the oldest continuously operating ice hockey league in Germany. The league was formed in 1948 after WWII as the highest level of hockey in Germany. The Oberliga has been the top, second and third level of ice hockey in the German league pyramid throughout its history. The 1948/49 Oberliga champions, EV Füssen, were the very first Deutscher Meister (English: German champion). In 2015/16, Oberliga was the first German league to admit a Dutch team, Tilburg Trappers, to compete in the German league system.

1948–58
The Oberliga started its first season in 1948/49 with six teams. Those teams played a home-and-away season to determine the German champion. The founding members of the league were:

 EV Füssen 
 Preußen Krefeld
 SC Riessersee
 VfL Bad Nauheim
 HC Augsburg
 Kölner EK

EV Füssen won the inaugural Oberliga championship and were named Oberliga and German champions. The league expanded to eight clubs for the second season and twelve in the third. From 1952 to 1956 the league trimmed the number of teams back to eight before working to restore the number to 12 by the 1957/58 season. The 1957/58 season was the last one for the league as the highest level of play in Germany. The German Ice Hockey Federation decided to form the Eishockey-Bundesliga to replace the Oberliga as the new top division. The top eight clubs from the Oberliga, qualified for the new top division with the bottom four remaining in the Oberliga.

1958–73
The Oberliga had now become the second tier of German ice hockey (second division). The league started with eight clubs, including the four remaining clubs from the previous season. The league expanded to twelve in the coming seasons. The year 1966 saw the league split into northern and southern regionalised groups. The two separate leagues were called Oberliga South and Oberliga North. The winners of the two leagues would determine the Oberliga champion in a home-and-away series.

The league reunited in a single division in 1970, now with a strength of 16 teams and direct promotion to the Bundesliga.

The 1972/73 season was the last one as a tier-two league. With the foundation of the 2nd Bundesliga, the Oberliga fell to tier three. While the league champion moved up to the Bundesliga and the teams placed two to nine gained entry to the new second division, only the bottom seven clubs remained in the league.

1973 saw DEB introduce a new second division to the German ice hockey pyramid, with the formation of the 2nd Bundesliga. The Oberliga was demoted to become the new German third division (third highest level of ice hockey in Germany). 1972-73 was the last season Oberliga operated as the division two league. The Oberliga champion that season was granted automatic promotion to the Bundesliga. Clubs that finished second to ninth qualified for automatic entry to the new 2nd Bundesliga, while the bottom seven clubs remained in Oberliga.

1973–94
The Oberliga was now again divided into a northern and a southern group. The top two teams out of the two divisions originally played out a promotion round to the 2nd Bundesliga which also served to determine the Oberliga champion. While the modus and number of teams in the league continued to fluctuate, the overall situation remained the same.

1994–99
The year 1994 saw major changes in the German league system. The Bundesliga and 2nd Bundesliga merged to form the new DEL, an independently run league consisting of 18 clubs in its foundation years. Those second division clubs that did not elect to join the DEL were integrated into the new 1st Liga, which had replaced the Oberliga and operated in a northern and a southern group. The best teams of each of the two divisions played out a DEB championship, similar to the old Oberliga championship.

The 1998-99 season was very much a transition season. The DEB had reintroduced a single-division, nationwide league, titled Bundesliga to compete with the DEL. The league below was now the 1st Liga, which was made up of those clubs from the 1st Liga not adCentred to the new Bundesliga and 2nd Liga clubs. However, this situation existed for only one season.

1999–present
From 1999, the league returned to its traditional name Oberliga, with two regional groups, north and south. In turn, the league above it took the name 2nd Bundesliga. The DEL renamed itself DEL - Bundesliga.

Due to a lack of interest, the Oberliga North dissolved after the 2000-01 season. The three clubs from this region that were still interested in playing at the Oberliga level joined the southern division.

The Oberliga South, largely made up of Bavarian clubs, continued to operate successfully in the coming season, usually including a couple of northern clubs, while the Oberliga North was not reestablished until 2007.

The ESBG, now operating the 2nd Bundesliga and Oberliga for the DEB, decided to reform an Oberliga North in 2007. The two separate divisions of the league were however not completely independent of each other, like in the past. Teams from the same league would meet each other four times now, while clubs from different divisions would only meet twice in the regular season. At the end of this, a combined play-off round would determine the Oberliga champion.

In 2007–08, the Oberliga was split into northern and southern groups for the first time since 2001. The northern group contains nine, and the southern ten clubs. The four top teams from each group enter a best-of-five play-off round to determine the Oberliga champion and the two teams promoted to the 2nd Bundesliga. The bottom four in each group enter a play-down round to determine the relegated teams.

In the 2008–09 season, the league played in a single-division format, before switching to four regional divisions with an Oberliga championship at the end from 2010 onwards.

In the summer of 2010, the organisation of the Oberliga broke away from the ESBG and the format was changed:
the Oberliga South was organised by the DEB beginning in 2010/11;
the new Oberliga West was organised by the LEV Northrhein-Westfalen;
the new Oberliga North was till 2012/13 organised by the LEV Niedersachsen - now also organised by the DEB;
the new Oberliga East was organised by the LEV Berlin 
The top teams from the West, North, and East groups play a final round in their groups after the regular season 
The top teams from the final round qualify for the promotion playoffs 
The teams from the South group play after the normal round playoffs for the teams, which qualify them for the promotion playoffs

Current teams

Champions and premiers

See also

 Deutsche Eishockey Liga, the DEL''
 2nd Bundesliga
 Bavarian ice hockey leagues

References

External links
 The Oberliga at Eishockey-Magazin
 The Oberliga at Hockeyweb.de
 Hockey Archives - International ice hockey website with tables and results (in French)
 Official website of the ESBG for the 2nd Bundesliga and Oberliga

 
Sports leagues established in 1948
1948 establishments in Germany
Ger
Professional ice hockey leagues in Germany